The Gachsaran oil field is an Iranian oil field located in Kohgiluyeh and Boyer-Ahmad Province and is around Gachsaran city or Dogonbadan. It was discovered in 1928 and developed by Anglo-Persian Oil Company. It began production of Crude oil in 1930. The field is owned by National Iranian Oil Company (NIOC) and operated by National Iranian South Oil Company (NISOC).

References

Oil fields of Iran